Marriage equality refers to a political status in which same-sex marriage and opposite-sex marriage are recognized as equal by the law.

Marriage equality may also refer to:

Law
 Marriage Equality Act (Vermont), a 2009 law enacted in the U.S. state of Vermont
 California Marriage Equality Act, a ballot initiative attempted in 2009 and 2010 in the U.S. state of California
 Marriage Equality Act (New York), a 2011 law enacted in the U.S. state of New York
 Hawaii Marriage Equality Act, a 2013 law enacted in the U.S. state of Hawaii
 Marriage Equality (Same Sex) Act 2013, a 2013 law enacted in the Australian Capital Territory, but later reversed
 Thirty-fourth Amendment of the Constitution (Marriage Equality) Bill 2015, an amendment to the Constitution of Ireland enacted by voter referendum

Groups
 Marriage Equality USA, an organization founded in 1998
 Marriage Equality Express, a project of Marriage Equality USA
 Marriage Equality California, an organization founded in 1998, now defunct

See also 
 
 
 
 Equal marriage (disambiguation)
 Marriage (Same Sex Couples) Act 2013, UK